The Blue Nile Road and Railway Bridge is a bascule bridge in Sudan, which links the capital Khartoum to the industrial city Khartoum North across the Blue Nile.

History
Built between 1907 and 1909 by Cleveland Bridge & Engineering Company from a design by engineer Georges Imbault, it is one of the oldest bridges in Khartoum and Sudan.

References

Bridges in Sudan
Buildings and structures in Khartoum
Bridges completed in 1909
Khartoum North
Railway bridges in Sudan